Rajasingamangalam block is a revenue block in the Ramanathapuram district of Tamil Nadu, India. It has a total of 35 panchayat villages. Tamil nadu’s second largest water resources in here.

References 

 

Revenue blocks of Ramanathapuram district